The Qionglin Tunnel is a tunnel in Jinhu, Kinmen County, Taiwan.

History
The tunnel was constructed in 1976.

Architecture
The tunnel spans over a total length of 1,355 meters, making it the largest defense tunnel in Kinmen. It has a total 12 entrances and exits which are connected to critical facilities around the village.

See also
 List of tourist attractions in Taiwan

References

1976 establishments in Taiwan
Jinhu Township
Military history of Taiwan
Military installations established in 1976
Tunnels in Kinmen County
Tunnel warfare